The Dollabarat Reef is a shoal situated 5 km (3 nautical miles) south-southeast of the Formigas Islets on the Formigas Bank in the Azores archipelago.

History
The reef is named after Pierre Dollabarats, Basque captain of the ship Maria de Sebourre, who accidentally discovered the reef when his small boat wrecked on it on 7 March 1788.

Since 16 June 2008, Dollabarat Reef and the neighboring Formigas Islets have been recognized as a Ramsar Convention wetland under the name Ilhéus das Formigas e Recife Dollabarat (reference number 1804).

Geography
The gradient around the Dollabarat is less accentuated.

Dollabarat Reef is one of the higher parts of the Formigas Bank, a seamount with similar volcanic origins as the Azores islands. The reef was formed from rocks emerging from volcanic activity in submarine volcanoes and deeper spaces composed of drained lava holes with an irregular morphology. The deeper parts of the Dollabarat are covered with large rocks and irregular plains covered with a carpet of seaweeds.

Given the relatively shallow waters, the reef is a peril to navigation, similar to sandy shorelines.

Biome
The strong currents, deep waters, and presence of sharks make diving difficult for those not familiar with open-ocean diving.

There is a large abundance of sea animals in the vicinity. In addition to species of sharks, other aquatic animals such as sea chub, trigger fish, mantas, turtles and dolphins have been observed in the waters around Dollabarat, including the Atlantic goliath grouper (usually found in depths between 10–40 m). The floor of the seamount is generally covered by a dense layer of seaweed, dominated by the Cystoseira species, a seaweed found in deeper areas. The Department of Oceanography and Fisheries at the University of the Azores (Ponta Delgada) monitors and studies these species annually through scientific missions to the reef and surrounding islets.

References
Notes

Sources
 
 

Volcanoes of Portugal
Islands of the Azores
Reefs of the Atlantic Ocean
Ramsar sites in Portugal